National Heroes Acre or simply Heroes Acre is a burial ground and national monument in Harare, Zimbabwe. The  site is situated on a ridge seven kilometres from Harare, towards Norton. Its stated purpose is to commemorate Patriotic Front guerrillas killed during the Rhodesian Bush War, and contemporary Zimbabweans whose dedication or commitment to their country justify their interment at the shrine. Persons buried here are considered heroes by the incumbent Zimbabwe African National Union – Patriotic Front regime, which has administered the country since independence at 1980. Indeed, most of the recipients of the 'hero status' were known to be Zanu-PF sympathisers. 

The actual monument itself is modeled after two AK-47s lying back-to-back; the graves are meant to resemble their magazines. It closely mirrors the design of the Revolutionary Martyrs' Cemetery in Taesong-guyŏk, just outside Pyongyang, North Korea.

The monument is an early example of work of the North Korean firm Mansudae Overseas Projects, which went on to construct a similar cemetery in Namibia, Heroes' Acre.

Construction
Work was initiated on the National Heroes' Acre in September 1981, a year after Zimbabwean independence. Ten Zimbabwean and seven North Korean architects and artists were recruited to map the site's layout. 250 local workers were involved in the project at the height of its construction. Black granite used for the main structures was quarried from Mutoko, about 140 kilometres northeast of the capital, then known as Salisbury. The cemetery was completed in 1982.

National Heroes

National Hero Status is the highest honour that can be conferred to an individual by Zimbabwe and the recipient is entitled to be buried at the National Heroes' Acre. As of 7 August 2001, 47 persons had been interred on site, rising to 161 by November 2022.

Features

The Tomb of the Unknown Soldier

The Tomb of the Unknown Soldier recognises unidentified insurgents who lost their lives during the liberation war. Included is a bronze statue of three guerrillas – one female, two male – a flagpole, and an ornate artifice.

The Eternal Flame
The Eternal Flame rests atop a tower measuring some forty metres. It was lit at independence celebrations in 1982 and embodies the spirit of Zimbabwean independence. The tower is the highest point at Heroes' Acre; it can readily be viewed from Harare.

Wall murals
Two walls on either side of the monument carry murals depicting the history of Zimbabwe, from pre-colonial times through the Chimurenga, the Rhodesian Bush War, and independence under national hero Robert Mugabe.

Museum
Near the entrance of Heroes' Acre is a museum dedicated to the rise of African nationalism in Zimbabwe and the anti-colonial struggle, showcasing artifacts, photographs, documents and other paraphernalia from the war and the period shortly after independence Zimbabwe National heroes buried at the shrine.

Burials 

Cephas Cele
Oliver Mtukudzi
Felix Ngwarati Muchemwa
Sabina Mugabe
Edgar Tekere
Samuel Mamutse
Dzingai Mutumbuka
Lameck Makanda
Daniel Nyamayaro Madzimbamuto
Stanford Shamu
Joshua Nkomo
Simon Mazorodze
Josiah Tongogara
Sally Mugabe
Jason Ziyaphapha Moyo
Alfred Nikita Mangena
Herbert Wiltshire Chitepo
Leopold Takawira
Masotsha Ndlovu
T. M. George Silundika
Johanna "Mama" MaFuyana
 Major General Charles Njodzi Dauramanzi
Edson Jonasi Mudadirwa Zvobgo
Julia Tukai Zvobgo
Simon Vengai Muzenda
Lookout Masuku
Herbert Sylvester Masiyiwa Ushewokunze
Moven Mahachi
Ernest R. Kadungure
Sydney Donald Malunga
Joseph Culverwell
General Solomon Rex Nhongo Mutusva- Mujuru
 Brig. General John Zingoni
Josiah Tungamirai
 Brigadier General Charles Tigwe Gumbo
Zororo Duri
Christopher Machingura Ushewokunze
Sikwili Kohli Moyo
Vitalis Zvinavashe
Chenjerai Hunzvi
Border Gezi
Robson Manyika
Josiah Mushore Chinamano
Swithun Mombeshora
Sabina Mugabe
Maurice Nyagumbo
Bernard Chidzero
Elliot Manyika
David Ishemunyoro Karimanzira
Livingstone Mernard Negidi Muzariri
 Brig. Gen. Armstrong Gunda
Misheck "Makasha" Chando
Guy Clutton-Brock
John Landa Nkomo
Herbert Mahlaba
 Lt. Gen. Amoth Chingombe
Edson Ncube
Elias Kanengoni
Nathan Shamuyarira
Kantibhai Gordanbhai
George Lifa (Maj.Gen)
Cornelius Nhloko
 Lieutenant Colonel Harold Chirenda
Mike Karakadzai
Kumbirai Kangai
Enos Nkala
Solomon Chirume Tawengwa
George Bodzo Nyandoro
Joseph Msika
Witness Mangwende
Gary Settled Tamayi Hlomayi Magadzire
Vivian Mwashita
Victoria Chitepo
Charles Utete
Cephas G. Msipa
Peter Chanetsa
Shuvai Mahofa
Stanley Gagisa Nleya
Major General Trust Mugoba
Sibusiso Moyo
Perence Shiri
Douglas Nyikayaramba
Biggie Joel Matiza

References

Buildings and structures in Harare
Cemeteries in Zimbabwe
Tourist attractions in Harare
Mansudae Overseas Projects